Axiocerses coalescens, the black-tipped scarlet, is a butterfly of the family Lycaenidae. It is found in wooded savanna areas in Gauteng, Mpumalanga, Limpopo and north-western South Africa and further to the north.

The wingspan is 24–32 mm for males and 25–34 mm for females. Adults are on wing year-round.

The larvae feed on Acacia species. They are associated with ants of the family Formicidae.

References

External links

Butterflies described in 1996
Axiocerses
Endemic butterflies of South Africa